Snooker world rankings 1981/1982: The professional world rankings for the top 32 snooker players in the 1981–82 season are listed below.

Players' performances in the previous three World Snooker Championships (1979, 1980 and 1981) contributed to their points total. For each of the three years, the World Champion gained five points, the runner-up received four, losing semi-finalists got three, losing quarter-finalists got two, and losers in the last-16 round received a single point.

Notes

References

1981
Rankings 1982
Rankings 1981